Peristeri Indoor Hall Andreas Papandreou, or Peristeri Arena, is an indoor sporting arena that is located in Peristeri, a western borough of Athens, Greece. The arena is named after Andreas Papandreou, the former Prime Minister of Greece, who died in 1996. It is located next to Peristeri Stadium. It is owned by the municipality of Peristeri. The seating capacity of the arena for basketball games is 4,000.

History
The arena was opened in the year 1989. It has been the long-time home arena of the Greek Basket League professional club team Peristeri. The arena has hosted big events, like EuroLeague games, when Peristeri competed in the league, in the early 2000s. Other Greek basketball teams, like Panellinios (for EuroCup games) and Panelefsiniakos, have also used the arena to host home games over the years.

References

External links
Information On The Arena @ Stadia.gr
Peristeri B.C. Celebration At Peristeri Arena 
Image of the arena's interior

G.S. Peristeri
Peristeri B.C.
Basketball venues in Greece
Indoor arenas in Greece
Sports venues in Athens